Richard Ligon (1585?–1662), an English author, lost his fortune as a royalist during the English Civil War (1642-1651), and during this turbulent time in England he found himself, as he notes in his narrative, a "stranger in my own country.” On 14 June 1647, he left for Barbados to gain his fortune in the New World, like many of his fellow countrymen. Ligon purchased half of a sugar plantation in Barbados. After two years residence on the island he was attacked by a fever, and returned to England in 1650. He was soon afterward put into prison by his creditors. There are conflicting reports as to whether his narrative was conceived of in prison as a way to pay off his creditors and gain his freedom, or before his imprisonment at the urging of Brian Duppa, Bishop of Salisbury. His work, a folio with maps and illustrations, is entitled A True and Exact History of the Island of Barbados and was published in London in 1657 and again in 1673.

Importance in literary analysis
Ligon's portrait of life in Barbados has made it into a number of literary journals and historical texts in an attempt by many scholars to derive exactly what life in the islands was like and exactly how Europeans, particularly the English, perceived slaves and their role in the sugar trade. One review in the journal Early American Literature offers a more linguistic approach to Ligon's texts. Author Thomas W. Krise reviews Keith A. Sandiford's analysis of words like "sweet" and "negotiation" in Ligon and says that such an analysis calls attention to various systems of contradiction present in our current understanding of Old World Caribbean culture.

Sources

Further reading

External links
Full text editions of Richard Ligon's History of Barbados can be found online at:
 Also available via HathiTrust.
 Also available via the Digital Library of the Caribbean.
 Text and parenthetical pagination derived from 1657 edition, images from the 1673 edition, and original annotations.
Emancipation Day Address by Saint Lucian government minister Damian Greaves in 2001, quoting Ligon. .

1580s births
1662 deaths
16th-century English writers
16th-century male writers
17th-century English writers
17th-century English male writers
People imprisoned for debt